No. 305 Polish Bomber Squadron "Ziemia Wielkopolska" ("Land of Greater Poland") was a Polish World War II bomber unit. It fought alongside the Royal Air Force under their operational Command and operated from airbases in the United Kingdom.

History
The last of the Polish bomber squadrons under Royal Air Force command, 305 Squadron was formed at RAF Bramcote, Warwickshire on 29 August 1940. It was initially equipped with the somewhat obsolete Fairey Battle aircraft, but was reequipped in November 1940 with twin-engine Vickers Wellington heavy bombers. The unit began operational flying in April 1941. Its first mission was bombing of petrol and fuel storage tanks at Rotterdam in the night from 25 to 26 April 1941. Between June 1941 and August 1943 the Squadron was based at RAF Ingham.

In August 1943, the Squadron was moved to RAF Swanton Morley and thereafter ceased its affiliation with RAF Bomber Command; instead, it was absorbed into the freshly formed Second Tactical Air Force, a specialized arm of the RAF that was centered on tactical air strikes on vital enemy targets (such as bridges, supply trains, etc.) in the European Continent.

During this period, 305 Squadron was transferred to No. 2 Group RAF and converted briefly to North American Mitchell medium bombers before adopting the De Havilland Mosquito FB.VI, the aircraft that the Squadron operated for the remainder of the European campaign. Through 1944, the 305 was stationed at RAF Lasham in England and then briefly at RAF Hartford Bridge before moving to the Epinoy airfield in France in November 1944. During the Normandy Landings, the squadron destroyed 13,000,000 liters of the German fuel stored near Nancy, France. The squadron performed its last mission exactly four years after their first, in the night of 25 to 26 April 1945. After the hostilities ended, the Squadron continued to operate in Germany as part of the occupation forces and, after a brief return to Britain, was finally disbanded formally on 6 January 1947 at RAF Faldingworth, having already given up its aircraft on 25 November 1946.

Aircraft operated

See also
Polish Air Forces in Great Britain
Polish contribution to World War II
Szczepan Ścibior, a pilot

References

Notes

Bibliography

 Halley, James J. The Squadrons of the Royal Air Force & Commonwealth, 1918–1988. Tonbridge, Kent, UK: Air-Britain (Historians) Ltd., 1988. .
 Jefford, C.G. RAF Squadrons, a Comprehensive Record of the Movement and Equipment of all RAF Squadrons and their Antecedents since 1912. Shrewsbury: Airlife Publishing, 2001. .
 Moyes, Philip J.R. Bomber Squadrons of the RAF and their Aircraft. London: Macdonald and Jane's (Publishers) Ltd., 1964 (new edition 1974). .
 Zieliński, Józef. 305 Dywizjon Bombowy Ziemi Wielkopolskiej I Lidzkiej. Dom Wydawniczy Bellona. . (In Polish)

External links

305 Squadron Living History Group
Photo Gallery of 305 Squadron
 Personnel of the Polish Air Force in Great Britain 1940-1947

305
305
Military units and formations established in 1940
Military units and formations disestablished in 1947